Leonard Eugene Boyle, OP,  (13 November 1923 – 25 October 1999), was an Irish and Canadian scholar in medieval studies and palaeography. He was the first Irish and North American Prefect of the Vatican Library in Rome from 1984 to 1997.

He was born in Ballintra, County Donegal, Ireland. Boyle entered the Dominican Order in 1943. He was ordained a priest in 1949, receiving his doctorate at Oxford University. He served as Professor of Latin Paleography and History of Medieval Theology at the Pontifical University of St. Thomas Aquinas in Rome from 1956 to 1961. He taught at the Pontifical Institute of Mediaeval Studies and the Centre for Medieval Studies at the University of Toronto from 1961 to 1984.

In 1984 he was appointed Prefect of the Vatican Library by Pope John Paul II. Boyle set about the digitization of the library's many manuscripts. Boyle employed women for the first time as part of the library's staff. In 1987, he was made an Officer of the Order of Canada. In 1997, he was ousted as Prefect after his dealings with some American fund-raising associates resulted in lawsuits involving the Vatican.

References

Further reading
 Duggan, Anne J., Joan Greatrex, and Brenda Bolton, eds. Omnia disce: medieval studies in memory of Leonard Boyle, O.P. Aldershot, Hants, England ; Burlington, VT : Ashgate, c2005.  
 Raftis, J. Ambrose. "Leonard Boyle, O.P. (1923-1999),"  Mediaeval Studies 62 (2000): vii-xxvi.
 Roma, Magistra Mundi: Itineraria Culturae Medievalis. Mélanges offerts à Père L.E. Boyle à l'occasion de son 75e anniversaire, edited by Jacqueline HAMESSE (Fédération Internationale des Instituts d'Etudes Médiévales, 10/1-3). Louvain-la-Neuve: Fédération Internationale des Instituts d'Etudes Médiévales, 1998.
 Stille, Alexander. Letter from Vatican City, Library Privileges, The New Yorker, 28 September 1998, p. 43

1923 births
1999 deaths
20th-century Irish Roman Catholic priests
People from County Donegal
Canadian Dominicans
Canadian medievalists
Canadian palaeographers
20th-century Canadian Roman Catholic priests
Irish Dominicans
Irish medievalists
Irish palaeographers
Officers of the Order of Canada
Irish emigrants to Canada
Irish expatriates in the United Kingdom